Jeffrey Austin Harris (born July 4, 1974 in Alameda, California) is a former Major League Baseball relief pitcher who is currently a professional scout for the Philadelphia Phillies. He batted and threw right-handed.

Career
When Harris debuted with the Seattle Mariners on April 2, he was 31 years of age. This was unusually old for a major league rookie, and was due to his meandering career. Harris played for the Quebec Capitales of the Canadian-American Association of Professional Baseball in 2003. The Mariners found Harris playing for the Capitales and signed him in June .

Harris made eight starts and three long-relief appearances in the 2005 season. He posted a 2-5 record with 25 strikeouts and a 4.19 ERA in 54.2 innings. In , Harris pitched in only 3 games early in season.

In December 2006, the Cleveland Indians signed Harris to a minor league contract. He became a free agent at the end of the  season and retired. He was named the pitching coach of the Arizona League Indians for the  season. He later was the pitching coach for the Lake County Captains in the Cleveland Indians organization.

References

External links
Baseball Reference
ESPN updates
NY Times
Minor League Splits and Situational Stats

1974 births
Living people
American expatriate baseball players in Canada
American expatriate baseball players in Mexico
Arizona League Mariners players
Baseball players from California
Buffalo Bisons (minor league) players
Chico Heat players
Elizabethton Twins players
Fort Myers Miracle players
Fort Wayne Wizards players
Kinston Indians players
Major League Baseball pitchers
Mexican League baseball pitchers
New Britain Rock Cats players
Philadelphia Phillies scouts
Rieleros de Aguascalientes players
Québec Capitales players
Salt Lake Buzz players
San Antonio Missions players
San Francisco Dons baseball players
Seattle Mariners players
Tacoma Rainiers players